The Evil One is a 1981 debut album by American psychedelic rock singer Roky Erickson with his band the Aliens, after his time with the band 13th Floor Elevators. The songs were recorded in 1979 with producer Stu Cook, former bass player of Creedence Clearwater Revival. Some material from those sessions was also released on the 1980 CBS UK album Roky Erickson and the Aliens. Cook played bass on two tracks, "Sputnik" and "Bloody Hammer."

The album was re-released on April 16, 2002 by Austin, Texas record label Sympathy for the Record Industry as a double-CD titled The Evil One (Plus One). The second disc is made up of a 48-minute appearance from August 20, 1979 on California radio station KSJO's The Modern Humans Show, on which Erickson plays rough mixes from the album and talks about music and horror films.

The CBS album was also reissued under the titleI Think of Demons (Edsel Records)

Reception
The album is considered by many critics to be an eccentric cult classic. Pitchfork reviewer Jason Heller called the album "brilliant. ... In a spasms of feral, lip-twisted fury, he snarls about demons, zombies, vampires, ghosts, and demons again with all the intensity of a rabies victim." Heller noted that Erickson's interest in horror and sci-fi imagery drew comparisons with the progressive hard rock of Blue Öyster Cult and Alice Cooper, as well as punk rock. Austin Chronicle writer Scott Schinder called Erickson's 1980s albums, released after his half-decade involuntary stay in a Texas psychiatric hospital, "the clearest glimpse into his raging musical soul." He described The Evil One as "the mother lode. It's the disc on which Erickson comes across most clear-eyed, and the source of many of his best-loved solo songs." Billboard writer Morgan Enos said that The Evil One "brims over with propulsive bangers about harrowing visions. ... Every moment slams with a galvanic precision." Mark Demin of AllMusic wrote that "The Evil One shows just how strong a rocker (Erickson) could be -- and how good a band he could put together. Great stuff, and certainly the best representation of Roky's "latter-day punk" period." Rolling Stone writer Hank Shteamer called the album "soulful and assured," noting that Erickson seemed fully at home even on the darkest material. Tony Bennett of the Duluth News Tribune noted that Erickson's personal troubles did not diminish the passion and intensity of his music, saying that "while his songs are unusual, indeed, the man could sing like a banshee. ... His voice possesses the traits that the greatest rock singers own. Energy, passion, good pitch, soul -- he's got it all."

Legacy and influence
In an obituary for Erickson after his 2019 death, British music magazine Kerrang! singled out The Evil One as perhaps Erickson's most influential album, calling it "an important precursor to the psychobilly and horror metal genres" for its "strange, cinematic approach to psychedelia." The magazine also praised "Night of the Vampire" as "easily the greatest vampire song in history. ... Roky paints on the vampire as he lives in the cultural subconscious, a being of film, literature, and ancient myth all at once."

The song "Two Headed Dog (Red Temple Prayer)" inspired the name of 1980s Los Angeles psychedelic/post-punk band Red Temple Spirits.

"Night of the Vampire" was covered by Entombed on its split EP with New Bomb Turks, released 1995 on Earache Records.

"If You Have Ghosts" was covered by Ghost in 2013 on its covers EP If You Have Ghost.

Track listing (1980 CBS Records LP)
(titled simply  Roky Erickson & The Aliens)

Track listing (1981 415 Records LP)

Track listing (1987 15-track combined release)
(titled The Evil One, first released by Restless Records, combines all tracks of the CBS and 415 releases)

Personnel
Stu Cook: Producer, bass on "Bloody Hammer" and "Sputnik"
Roky Erickson: Vocals and guitars
Duane Aslaksen: Guitars and vocals
Bill Miller: Electric autoharp
Andre Lewis: Electronic keyboards
Steven Morgan Burgess: Bass
Fuzzy Furioso: Drums

Additional musicians:
Jeff Sutton: Drums on "Bloody Hammer" and "Sputnik"
Scott Matthews: Drums on "White Faces" 
Brian Marnell: Background vocals on "Creature With the Atom Brain" and "I Walked With a Zombie"

References

External links

1981 albums
Roky Erickson albums
CBS Records albums